Markus Schurch (born 7 June 1908, date of death unknown) was a Swiss sailor. He competed in the 5.5 Metre event at the 1952 Summer Olympics.

References

External links
 

1908 births
Year of death missing
Swiss male sailors (sport)
Olympic sailors of Switzerland
Sailors at the 1952 Summer Olympics – 5.5 Metre
Place of birth missing